Lovell Bros. are distillers of corn whiskey from sour mash in the US state of Georgia.

References

Distilleries in Georgia (U.S. state)
Moonshine producers
Whiskies of the United States
Food and drink companies based in Georgia (U.S. state)